Callophrys nelsoni, or Nelson's hairstreak, is a species of butterfly belonging to the genus Callophrys. It is found throughout the west coast of the United States. Although they can be found along the very bottom of Canada's British Columbia and down to Baja California Norte. They can found in coniferous forests.

References

nelsoni